Tobias Borchgrevink Børkeeiet (born 18 April 1999) is a Norwegian professional footballer who plays as midfielder for the Eliteserien club Rosenborg.

Club career

Stabæk
He grew up at Bekkestua and entered the youth department of Stabæk at the age of five. He climbed through the ranks and  attended the sport secondary school NTG Bærum. On 11 March 2018, Børkeeiet made his professional debut for Stabæk, in an away match against Strømsgodset. Marcus Pedersen scored twice on behalf of the home team, but goals from Franck Boli and Ohi Omoijuanfo secured a 2–2 draw. Børkeeiet started the game on the bench and made an appearance as a substitute for Hugo Vetlesen four minutes before full-time by head coach Toni Ordinas. He scored his first goal on 5 December 2018, in a relegation play-off match against Aalesunds FK, which was the only goal of the game, as Stabæk won 1–0 and secured another season in the top-flight Eliteserien.

By the time of his departure in July 2019, he had made 44 appearances and scored one goal for Stabæk.

Brøndby
On 5 July 2019, Børkeeiet moved to Denmark to join Superliga club Brøndby IF on a five-year contract, for an undisclosed fee, reported to be around €1.1 million. He made his official debut for the club six days later as a substitute in a 4–1 home win over Inter Turku in the first qualifying round of the 2019–20 UEFA Europa League. In September, Børkeeiet suffered a hip injury keeping him out for some months. On 9 January 2020, it was decided that the injury would need surgery, which was performed a week later.

Børkeeiet returned to the pitch on 20 September 2020, making a substitute appearance in Brøndby's 2–1 away win over rivals FC Copenhagen in the Copenhagen Derby.

On 8 August 2021, Børkeeiet scored his first goal for the club – also against FC Copenhagen in the Copenhagen Derby – which ended in a 4–2 away loss.

Rosenborg
On 25 January 2022, Børkeeiet signed a three-year contract with Rosenborg. He made his competitive debut for the club on 3 April, immediately scoring a brace against defending champions Bodø/Glimt to secure a 2–2 draw.

International career
Børkeeiet represented the Norway national under-19 team, and participated in the 2018 UEFA European Under-19 Championship which took place in Finland. During the tournament, he made three appearances as a starter.

Børkeeiet then played for the under-20 team at the 2019 FIFA U-20 World Cup in Poland. During the tournament, he gained three caps as a starter. He distinguished himself by providing two assists, against Uruguay (3–1 loss) and Honduras (12–0 win).

He received his first selection with the Norway under-21 team on 11 September 2018 for a UEFA Under-21 Euro 2019 qualifier against Azerbaijan, which ended in a 1–3 win.

Career statistics

Honours
Brøndby
 Danish Superliga: 2020–21

References

1999 births
Living people
Sportspeople from Bærum
Norwegian footballers
Norway youth international footballers
Norway under-21 international footballers
Association football midfielders
Eliteserien players
Danish Superliga players
Stabæk Fotball players
Brøndby IF players
Rosenborg BK players
Norwegian expatriate footballers
Expatriate men's footballers in Denmark
Norwegian expatriate sportspeople in Denmark